Niger competed at the 1984 Summer Olympics in Los Angeles, United States.  The nation returned to the Olympic Games after boycotting both the 1976 Games and the 1980 Games.

Athletics

Men
Track & road events

Boxing
Men

References
Official Olympic Reports

Nations at the 1984 Summer Olympics
1984
1984 in Niger
Oly